Bounty is an American brand of paper towel that is manufactured by Procter & Gamble (P&G) in the United States. It was introduced in 1965.

History 
Bounty, whose tag line, "the quicker-picker-upper!" came about through the acquisition of Charmin in 1957 by Procter & Gamble (P&G), its first consumer-paper products business. Charmin Towels was the successful predecessor to Bounty, which led to P&G's strategic investment in research and development of the innovative Bounty. While most paper towels were being marketed promoting their strength or softness, P&G found consumers primarily preferred absorbency. With this new idea for marketing, Bounty replaced Charmin towels in 1965, and introduced a new 2-ply towel which was thicker, softer, and more absorbent than on the market.

Advertising 

From the 1960s to the 1990s, veteran character actress Nancy Walker appeared in a long-running series of popular commercials in the US, in which Walker played Rosie, a waitress in a diner,  who used Bounty to clean up spills made by the diner's patrons and demonstrating its better absorption, compared to other brands. The original tag-line, "the quick picker-upper",  was soon changed to "the quicker picker-upper", which became a common catchphrase (with variations) long after Walker ceased appearing in Bounty ads.

In the UK, they had a campaign featuring 2 large, stubbly men wearing wigs and dresses referred to as Brenda and Audrey performing household tasks that require a paper towel and comparing them to other products. Later, the adverts featured a man known as Juan Sheet, a pun on "one sheet", using the slogan "one sheet does Plenty" (Plenty being the name of the product in the UK at the time.)

Product
Consumer Reports reported (2014) the best paper towel was Bounty DuraTowel,  followed by the next two on the list also being Bounty products.

In 1998, Bounty started selling napkins.

Sale of British rights 
In 2007, P&G sold its European business that also produced "Bounty" to SCA, and the product was then rebranded to Plenty in the UK.

In popular culture 
 In Season 9 Episode 1 (Road Rage) of the American documentary series Forensic Files, a homicide case was solved with forensic evidence that included Bounty paper towels.

References

External links 

Paper products
Products introduced in 1965
Cleaning product brands
Procter & Gamble brands